Aulos-Sinsat is a commune in the Ariège department in southwestern France. The municipality was established on January 1, 2019 by merger of the former communes of Aulos and Sinsat.

References

Communes of Ariège (department)
Communes nouvelles of Ariège
2019 establishments in France
Populated places established in 2019